A list of films produced in Italy in 1936 (see 1936 in film):

See also
List of Italian films of 1935
List of Italian films of 1937

References

External links
Italian films of 1936 at the Internet Movie Database

Italian
1936
Films